Phymosoma is an extinct genus of echinoids that lived from the Cretaceous to the Eocene.  Its remains have been found in Asia, Europe, and North America.

Sources
 Fossils (Smithsonian Handbooks) by David Ward (Page 179)

External links
Phymosoma in the Paleobiology Database

Phymosomatoida
Prehistoric echinoid genera
Cretaceous echinoderms
Paleocene echinoderms
Eocene animals
Prehistoric animals of Asia
Prehistoric animals of Europe
Prehistoric echinoderms of North America
Cretaceous genus first appearances
Maastrichtian genera
Danian genera
Selandian genera
Thanetian genera
Ypresian genera
Eocene genus extinctions